This is a non-exhaustive list of Democratic Republic of the Congo women's international footballers – association football players who have appeared at least once for the senior DR Congo women's national football team.

Players

See also 
 DR Congo women's national football team

References 

 
International footballers
Congo, Democratic Republic of the
Football in the Democratic Republic of the Congo
Association football player non-biographical articles